The eighth season of Indonesian Idol, also known as Indonesian Idol 2014: A Decade of Dreams, premiered on RCTI on December 27, 2013. Anang Hermansyah and Ahmad Dhani returned as the judges. Agnes Monica was replaced by Tantri of Kotak, and Titi DJ, who returned to the show for her sixth season after her absence in season 6 and 7. Raisa and Indra Lesmana replace Titi and Anang during the Yogyakarta auditions. Later during the Spectacular weeks, Raisa replaced Titi during the Top 9 performances and Tantri during the Top 5. Indra replaced Tantri during the Top 8 performances. Daniel Mananta returns as the host.

The season was the sixth to have four judges, after the first five seasons.

Judges
In September 2013, it was confirmed that Ahmad Dhani and Anang Hermansyah would return as the judges for another season, but was reported that Agnes Monica would not return as the judge for this season. In November 2013, the source wrote that Titi DJ signed a deal to join the panel as the third judge. On December 18, 2013, Tantri and Titi were officially announced as judges for this season. Titi is the first Indonesian Idol 2014  judge to return after being absent in Season 6 and 7.

Regional auditions
In an attempt to refresh the show's audition process, new ways to audition were announced. First is the "Audition Bus Tour", a seven town nationwide tour that will give hopefuls who couldn't make it to one of the large audition cities a chance to try out. The cities are Jember, Malang, Madiun, Solo, Purwokerto, Cirebon and Sukabumi. Idol is also starting the "I Want You" program, which will let friends and family of individuals they think could be the next Indonesian Idol nominate said person in secret by filling out an online form and existing video or URL of their nominee—they must be singing solo and a capella. The chosen auditions will then be surprised on location by a film crew and given an opportunity to advance to the next round. Others way are "Idol Dream Box" and "Daniel's Choice". Finally, online auditions for season 8 were open from November 22–26, 2013. Closed auditions was held in Balikpapan, Ambon, Padang and Makassar. Open auditions took place in the following cities:

Elimination round
Held at the 4th Studio of RCTI for the second straight year, the first day of the elimination round featured the 97 contestants from the auditions round singing solo a cappella. 41 contestants advanced. The next round required the contestants to split up into 10 groups and perform. 27 of them advanced to the finals of the elimination round requiring a solo performance with a full band. 15 of them made it to the Top 15 show where the judges take contestants one by one and tell them if they made the final 15.

Semi-finals

Top 15 show
The Top 15 Show was aired LIVE on 14 February at 8:00 pm. Due to the flight problem, Anang couldn't attend the show, so he was replaced by Bebi Romeo. The contestants perform songs of their choice (there was no particular theme). 7 contestants who got the most vote would advance automatically, while the judges would decide the contestants who they wanted to advance (Anang revealed his decision via Skype). The remaining 4 got a chance to sing once more, and the public would vote again. At first, it was revealed that only one would move on. There were fifteen semifinalists, ten females and five males. Below are the contestants listed in their performance order.

Wild Card round

Finalists
 Nowela Elisabeth Mikhelia Auparay (born December 19, 1987) is a cafe singer from Jayapura, Papua. She was announced as the winner on May 23, 2014.
 Husein Alatas (born July 5, 1989) is a band vocalist from Jakarta,  He was announced as the runner-up on May 23, 2014.
 Di Muhammad Devirzha (born May 12, 1990) is a freelancer from Medan, North Sumatra, he came in 3rd place.
 Yuka Tamada (born December 28, 1994) is student from Makassar, South Sulawesi, she came in 4th place.
 Muhammad Yusuf Nur Ubay (born March 29, 1996) is a student from Magelang, Central Java, he came in 5th place.
 Giofanny Elliandrian (born May 16, 1988) is a band vocalist from Manado, North Sulawesi, he came in 6th place.
 Windy Yunita Ghemary (born June 2, 1993) is a student from Jakarta, she came in 7th place.
 Maesarah Nur Zakah (born February 22, 1992) is a student from Bandung, West Java, she came in 8th place.
 Yunita Nursetia Tongke (born April 17, 1987) is a marketing staff from Makassar, South Sulawesi, she came in 9th place.
 Miranti Yassovi Amalia (born January 23, 1989) is wedding singer from Jakarta, she came in 10th place.
 Dewi Puspita Andini (born March 24, 1997) is a student from Madiun, East Java, she came in 11th place.
 Ryan Dewangga 'D' Angga'  (born October 25, 1994) is a student from Cirebon, West Java, he came in 12th place.
 Martinha Tereza Cruz Costa Ribeiro de Souza (born February 4, 1990) is a vocal coach from Madiun, East Java, she came in 13th place.

Spectacular Live Show
This episode was first broadcast at 21:00 (UTC+7) on February 21, 2014. In this season, there are 13 weeks of the finals and 13 finalists, with one finalist eliminated per week based on the Indonesian public's votes.

Top 13 - Dream Comes True 

Group Performance: Idola Indonesia (Indonesian Idol theme song)

Top 12 - Indonesian Mega Hits 

Group Performance: Idola Indonesia (Indonesian Idol theme song)

Top 11 (first week) - Worldwide Top Chart 
On the Top 11, was announced the new system, so the contestant with two fewest vote (bottom two) will sing again, and the public will vote to decide who stay and go (named Flash Vote).

 Due to the passing of her father, Windy Yunita did not perform and were given a bye to the next week. She would have performed "She Wolf (Falling to Pieces)". On the result show, it was planned that the bottom 2 vote getters would sing once again, and the public would vote again (Flash Vote). However, the bottom two vote getters, Husein Alatas and Miranti Yassovi were declared safe with another contestant and no one was eliminated.

Top 11 (second week) - My Love Story 
It was revealed on the previous week that 2 contestants will be eliminated.

Top 9 - The Soundtracks

Top 8 - We Will Rock You 

Group Performance: 
 We Will Rock You / I Love Rock 'n Roll
 Idola Indonesia (Indonesian Idol theme song)

Top 7 - Instant Hits 
Guest Mentor: Ruben Studdard

Group Performance: Idola Indonesia (Indonesian Idol theme song)

Top 6 (first week) - Judges' Choice 
For the first time in the competition, each finalist will sing two songs. Both songs will be chosen by the finalists with an advice from their own mentor.

Group Performance: Idola Indonesia (Indonesian Idol theme song)

Top 6 (second week) - From East To West 
Each finalist will sing two songs: one will be in Indonesian (especially Dangdut and Melayu ), and the other one in English. There is no more veto rights for this round and the Flash Vote system will be no longer used.

Top 5 - From the Bottom of the Heart 
Each finalist will sing two songs: one will be a song about their own interpretation of galau and the other one will be a tribute to their fans. 

Group Performance: Sahabat

Top 4 - The Fabulous Four 
Each finalist will sing three songs: a solo performance, duet with celebrity, and a collaboration with one of the contestants and one of the judges.

 Husein and Vierzha with Titi DJ - "Cinta Mati"
 Yuka and Nowela with Tantri - "Jangan Ada Angkara"

Top 3 - Road to Grand Final 
Each finalists will sing three songs: International Diva songs (solo performance), duet with celebrity, and a collaboration with one of the contestants and one of the judges.

 Husein and Virzha with Ahmad Dhani - "One of Us"
 Nowela and Anang Hermansyah - "Jodohku"
 Group Performance 
 "We Are Young" 
 "Esok Kan Bahagia" & "Jangan Menyerah" (with D'Masiv)

Grand Final 

 Opening:
 Indonesian Idol All Stars - "Bohemian Rhapsody"
 Nowela - "Let It Go" / "Bukan Dia Tapi Aku" / "Wrecking Ball"
 Husein - "Skyfall" / "Madu Tiga" / "Titanium"
 Nowela & Husein - "Don't Stop Believin'" & "It's My Life"
 Closing:
 Indonesian Idol All Stars - "Karena Cinta"
 Nowela & Husein feat. Indonesian Idol All Stars - "Idola Indonesia" (Indonesian Idol theme song)

Elimination Chart

 Due to the passing of her father, Windy Yunita did not perform and were given a bye to the next week.

Results show performances

Indonesia Nielsen ratings

References

External links
 Official website 

Indonesian Idol
2013 Indonesian television seasons
2014 Indonesian television seasons